Hidden Lake is a small glacial lake in the Skoki Valley of Banff National Park, Canada. It is located in the Slate Range of the Canadian Rockies.

The lake can be reached by following a hiking trail for  starting at Fish Creek, at the base of the Lake Louise Ski Area, near Lake Louise. A backcountry campground is situated one km before reaching the lake.
The lake is the starting point for possible ascents of Mount Richardson, Pika Peak and Ptarmigan Peak.

The glacial waters of the lake are drained by Corral Creek through the Sikoki Valley into the Bow River.

See also
List of lakes of Alberta

References

Banff National Park
Lakes of Alberta
Mountain lakes
Glacial lakes of Canada